Mahmoud Najdi (born 1 January 1989) is a professional footballer who plays as a midfielder for German club TuS Hannibal. Born in Germany, Najdi is of Lebanese descent and represented Lebanon internationally at youth level.

Club career
The midfielder played in the 3. Liga for Wuppertaler SV Borussia.

References

1989 births
Living people
German footballers
Lebanese footballers
Footballers from North Rhine-Westphalia
People from Witten
Sportspeople from Arnsberg (region)
German people of Lebanese descent
Association football midfielders
Wuppertaler SV players
Fortuna Düsseldorf II players
Schwarz-Weiß Essen players
TV Jahn Hiesfeld players
3. Liga players
Lebanon youth international footballers